David McLeod (born August 15, 1971) is a former American football player who played seven seasons in the Arena Football League with the Albany Firebirds, Grand Rapids Rampage, Carolina Cobras and Tampa Bay Storm. McLeod played college football at James Madison University. In 1996, he was the first recipient of the AFL Defensive Player of the Year Award and was named Second Team All-Arena.

References

External links
Carolina Cobras profile

Living people
1971 births
Players of American football from Richmond, Virginia
American football wide receivers
American football defensive backs
African-American players of American football
James Madison Dukes football players
Albany Firebirds players
Grand Rapids Rampage players
Carolina Cobras players
Tampa Bay Storm players